Rezaabad (also Romanized as Reẕāābād; also known as Reẕāābād-e Āstāneh) is a village in Howmeh Rural District, in the Central District of Shirvan County, North Khorasan Province, Iran. At the 2006 census, its population was 646, in 149 families.

References 

Populated places in Shirvan County